Ruby Dee (October 27, 1922 – June 11, 2014) was an American actress, poet, playwright, screenwriter, journalist, and civil rights activist. She originated the role of "Ruth Younger" in the stage and film versions of A Raisin in the Sun (1961). Her other notable film roles include The Jackie Robinson Story (1950) and Do the Right Thing (1989).

Dee was married to Ossie Davis, with whom she frequently performed until his death in 2005.

For her performance as Mama Lucas in American Gangster (2007), Dee was nominated for the Academy Award for Best Supporting Actress and won the Screen Actors Guild Award for Female Actor in a Supporting Role. Dee was a Grammy, Emmy, Obie and Drama Desk winner. She was also a National Medal of Arts, Kennedy Center Honors and Screen Actors Guild Life Achievement Award recipient.

Early life
Dee was born on October 27, 1922, in Cleveland, Ohio, the daughter of Gladys (née Hightower) and Marshall Edward Nathaniel Wallace, a cook, waiter and porter. After her mother left the family, Dee's father remarried, to Emma Amelia Benson, a schoolteacher.

Dee was raised in Harlem, New York. Prior to attending Hunter College High School, she studied at Public Schools 119 and 136. Then, she went on to graduate from Hunter College with a degree in Romance languages in 1945. She was a member of Delta Sigma Theta.

Career
Dee joined the American Negro Theatre as an apprentice, working with Sidney Poitier, Harry Belafonte, and Hilda Simms. She made several appearances on Broadway, such as her first role in ANT's 1946 production of Anna Lucasta. Her first onscreen role was in That Man of Mine in 1946. She received national recognition for her role in the 1950 film The Jackie Robinson Story. In 1965, Dee performed in lead roles at the American Shakespeare Festival as Kate in The Taming of the Shrew and Cordelia in King Lear, becoming the first black actress to portray a lead role in the festival. Her career in acting crossed all major forms of media over a span of eight decades, including the films A Raisin in the Sun, in which she recreated her stage role as a suffering housewife in the projects, and Edge of the City. She played both roles opposite Poitier.

During the 1960s, Dee appeared in Gone Are the Days! and The Incident. In 1969, Dee appeared in 20 episodes of Peyton Place. She appeared as Cora Sanders, a Marxist college professor, in the Season 1/Episode 14 of Police Woman, entitled "Target Black" which aired on Friday night, January 3, 1975. The character of Cora Sanders was obviously, but loosely, influenced by the real-life Angela Davis. She appeared in one episode of The Golden Girls sixth season. She played Queen Haley in Roots: The Next Generations, a 1979 miniseries.

Dee was nominated for eight Emmy Awards, winning once for her role in the 1990 TV film Decoration Day. She was nominated for her television guest appearance in the China Beach episode, "Skylark". Her husband Ossie Davis (1917–2005) also appeared in the episode. She appeared in Spike Lee's 1989 film Do the Right Thing, and his 1991 film Jungle Fever.

In 1995, she and Davis were awarded the National Medal of Arts. They were also recipients of the Kennedy Center Honors in 2004. In 2003, she narrated a series of WPA & slave narratives in the HBO film Unchained Memories. In 2007 the winner of the Grammy Award for Best Spoken Word Album was shared by Dee and Ossie Davis for With Ossie and Ruby: In This Life Together, and former President Jimmy Carter.

Dee was nominated for an Academy Award for Best Supporting Actress in 2007 for her portrayal of Mama Lucas in American Gangster. She won the Screen Actors Guild award for the same performance. At 85 years of age, Dee is currently the third oldest nominee for Best Supporting Actress, behind Gloria Stuart and Judi Dench (both 87) when nominated for her role in American Gangster. This was Dee's only Oscar nomination.

On February 12, 2009, Dee joined the Aaron Copland School of Music at Queens College orchestra and chorus, along with the Riverside Inspirational Choir and NYC Labor Choir, in honoring Abraham Lincoln's 200th birthday at the Riverside Church in New York City. Under the direction of Maurice Peress, they performed Earl Robinson's The Lonesome Train: A Music Legend for Actors, Folk Singers, Choirs, and Orchestra, in which Dee was the narrator.

Dee's last role in a theatrically released film was in the Eddie Murphy comedy A Thousand Words, in which she portrayed the mother of Murphy's protagonist. Perhaps, her penultimate film role is in 1982, which premiered at the 2013 Toronto International Film Festival and was released on home video on March 1, 2016. It is unknown whether her final role will ever be seen, as King Dog was in production at the time of her death, and no release date has ever been announced.

Personal life and activism
Ruby Wallace married blues singer Frankie Dee Brown in 1941, and began using his middle name as her stage name. The couple divorced in 1945. Three years later she married actor Ossie Davis, whom she met while costarring in Robert Ardrey's 1946 Broadway play Jeb. Together, Dee and Davis wrote an autobiography in which they discussed their political activism and their decision to have an open marriage (later changing their views). Together they had three children: son, blues musician Guy Davis, and two daughters, Nora Day and Hasna Muhammad. Dee was a breast cancer survivor of more than three decades.

In 1979, the Supersisters trading card set was produced and distributed; one of the cards featured Dee's name and picture.

Dee and Davis were well-known civil rights activists in the Civil Rights Movement. Dee was a member of the Congress of Racial Equality (CORE), the NAACP, the Student Nonviolent Coordinating Committee, Delta Sigma Theta sorority, and the Southern Christian Leadership Conference. She was also as an active member of the Harlem Writers Guild for over 40 years. In 1963, Dee emceed the March on Washington for Jobs and Freedom. Dee and Davis were both personal friends of both Martin Luther King Jr. and Malcolm X, with Davis giving the eulogy at Malcolm X's funeral in 1965. In 1970, she won the Frederick Douglass Award from the New York Urban League.

In 1999, Dee and Davis were arrested at 1 Police Plaza, the headquarters of the New York Police Department, protesting the police shooting of Amadou Diallo.

In early 2003, The Nation published "Not in Our Name", an open proclamation vowing opposition to the impending US invasion of Iraq. Ruby Dee and Ossie Davis were among the signatories, along with Robert Altman, Noam Chomsky, Susan Sarandon, and Howard Zinn, among others.

In November 2005, Dee was awarded – along with her late husband – the Lifetime Achievement Freedom Award, presented by the National Civil Rights Museum located in Memphis. Dee, a long-time resident of New Rochelle, New York, was inducted into the New Rochelle Walk of Fame which honors the most notable residents from throughout the community's 325-year history. She was also inducted into the Westchester County Women's Hall of Fame on March 30, 2007, joining such other honorees as Hillary Clinton and Nita Lowey. In 2009, she received an honorary Doctor of Fine Arts degree from Princeton University.Princeton awards five honorary degrees (news release) News at Princeton. Princeton University. June 2, 2009. Retrieved May 3, 2016

Death
Dee died on June 11, 2014, at her home in New Rochelle, New York, from natural causes at the age of 91. In a statement, Gil Robertson IV of the African-American Film Critics Association said, "the members of the African American Film Critics Association are deeply saddened at the loss of actress and humanitarian Ruby Dee. Throughout her seven-decade career, Dee embraced different creative platforms with her various interpretations of black womanhood and also used her gifts to champion for Human Rights."

"She very peacefully surrendered", said her daughter Nora Day. "We hugged her, we kissed her, we gave her our permission to go. She opened her eyes. She looked at us. She closed her eyes, and she set sail." Following her death, the marquee on the Apollo Theater read: "A TRUE APOLLO LEGEND RUBY DEE 1922–2014".

Dee was cremated, and her ashes are held in the same urn as that of Davis, with the inscription "In this thing together". A public memorial celebration honoring Dee was held on September 20, 2014, at the Riverside Church in Upper Manhattan. Their shared urn was buried at Ferncliff Cemetery in Hartsdale, New York.

Work

Filmography

Short subjects:
 Lorraine Hansberry: The Black Experience in the Creation of Drama (1975)
 The Torture of Mothers (1980)
 Tuesday Morning Ride (1995)
 The Unfinished Journey (1999) (narrator)
 The New Neighbors (2009) (narrator)

Television

 The Bitter Cup (1961)
 Seven Times Monday (1962)
 The Fugitive (1963)
 The Great Adventure (1963) 
 Of Courtship and Marriage (1964)
 Guiding Light (cast member in 1967)
 Peyton Place (cast member from 1968 to 1969)
 Deadlock (1969)
 Sesame Street (1970)
 The Sheriff (1971)

 It's Good to Be Alive (1974)
 Police Woman Season 1 / Episode 14 "Target Black" (1975)
 Roots: The Next Generations (1979) (miniseries)
 I Know Why the Caged Bird Sings (1979)
 All God's Children (1980)
 With Ossie and Ruby! (1980–1982)
 Long Day's Journey into Night (1982)
 Go Tell It on the Mountain (1984)
 The Atlanta Child Murders (1985) (miniseries)
 Windmills of the Gods (1988)
 Gore Vidal's Lincoln (1988)
 The Court-Martial of Jackie Robinson (1990)
 Decoration Day (1990)
 Golden Girls (1990)
 Jazztime Tale (1991) (voice)
 Middle Ages (1992–1993)
 The Ernest Green Story (1993)
 The Stand (1994) (miniseries)
 Whitewash (1994) (voice)
 Mr. and Mrs. Loving (1996)
 Captive Heart: The James Mink Story (1996)
 The Wall (1998)
 Little Bill (1999 – 2004) (voice)
 Passing Glory (1999)
 Having Our Say: The Delany Sisters' First 100 Years (1999)
 A Storm in Summer (2000)
 Finding Buck McHenry (2000)
 The Feast of All Saints (2001) (miniseries)
 Taking Back Our Town (2001)
 Their Eyes Were Watching God (2005)
 Meet Mary Pleasant (2008)
 America (2009)

Stage

 On Strivers Row (1940)
 Natural Man (1941)
 Starlight (1942)
 Three's a Family (1943)
 South Pacific (1943)
 Walk Hard (1944)
 Jeb (1946)
 Anna Lucasta (1946) (replacement for Hilda Simms)
 Arsenic and Old Lace (1946)
 John Loves Mary (1946)
 A Long Way From Home (1948)
 The Smile of the World (1949)
 The World of Sholom Aleichem (1953)
 A Raisin in the Sun (1959)
 Purlie Victorious (1961)

 King Lear (1965)
 The Taming of the Shrew (1965)

 The Birds (1966)
 Oresteia (1966)
 Boesman and Lena (1970)
 The Imaginary Invalid (1971)
 The Wedding Band (1972)
 Hamlet (1975)
 Bus Stop (1979)
 Twin-Bit Gardens (1979)
 Zora is My Name! (1983)
 Checkmates (1988)
 The Glass Menagerie (1989)
 The Disappearance (1993)
 Flying West (1994)
 Two Hahs-Hahs and a Homeboy (1995)
 My One Good Nerve: A Visit with Ruby Dee (1996)
 A Last Dance for Sybil (2002)
 Saint Lucy's Eyes (2003)

Discography

 The Original Read-In for Peace in Vietnam (Folkways Records, 1967)
 The Poetry of Langston Hughes (with Ossie Davis. Caedmon Records, no date, TC 1272)
Let Us Now Praise Famous Men (with George Grizzard. Caedmon Records, 1970, TC 1324)
Tough Poems For Tough People (with Ossie Davis and Henry Braun. Caedmon Records, 1972, TC 1396)
To Make A Poet Black: The best poems of Countee Cullen (with Ossie Davis. Caedmon Records, 1971, TC 1400 
To Be A Slave (with Ossie Davis. Caedmon Records, 1972, TC 2066)
The Lost Zoo, (Caedmon Records, 1978, TC 1539)
Why Mosquitoes Buzz In People's Ears and Other Tales with Ossie Davis. Caedmon Records, 1978, TC 1592) 
 What if I am a Woman?, Vol. 1: Black Women's Speeches (Folkways, 1977)
 What if I am a Woman?, Vol. 2: Black Women's Speeches (Folkways, 1977)
 Every Tone a Testimony (Smithsonian Folkways, 2001) 
American Short Stories, Vol 2: Various Artists(eav Lexington, no date, LE 7703)
American Short Stories, Vol 3: Various Artists (eav Lexington, no date, LE 7704)
I've got a name, Various Artists (Holt's Impact, 1968, CSM 662) 
At your own risk, Various Artists (Holt's Impact, 1968, CSM 663)
Conflict, Various Artists (Holt's Impact, 1969, CSM 816)
Sight lines, Various Artists (Holt's Impact, 1970, SBN 03-071525-3)
Roses & Revolutions, Various Artist (D.S.T. Telecommunications, Inc., Production, 1975)
New Dimensions in Music (with John Cullum. CBS Records, 1976, P 13161)

Awards and nominationsAwards 1961: National Board of Review Award for Best Supporting Actress – A Raisin in the Sun
 1971: Drama Desk Award Outstanding Performance – Boesman and Lena
 1971: Obie Award for Best Performance by an Actress – Boesman and Lena
 1973: Drama Desk Award Outstanding Performance – Wedding Band
 1988: Induction into the American Theater Hall of Fame
 1991: Emmy Award for Outstanding Supporting Actress in a Miniseries or a Movie – Decoration Day
 1991: Women in Film Crystal Award
 1995: National Medal of Arts
 2000: Screen Actors Guild Lifetime Achievement Award
2003: Women of Vision Award - Women in Film & Video-DC 
 2007: Grammy Award for Best Spoken Word Album – With Ossie And Ruby: In This Life Together (tied with Jimmy Carter)
 2008: African–American Film Critics Best Supporting Actress – American Gangster
 2008: Screen Actors Guild Outstanding Performance by a Female Actor in a Supporting Role – American Gangster
 2008: The Eleanor Roosevelt Val-Kill Medal Award
 2008: She was awarded the Spingarn Medal from the NAACP.Nominations'''
 1964: Emmy Award for Outstanding Single Performance by an Actress in a Leading Role – The Doctors and the Nurses: Express Stop from Lenox Avenue 1979: Emmy Award for Outstanding Supporting Actress in a Limited Series or a Special – Roots: The Next Generations 1988: Emmy Award for Outstanding Supporting Actress in a Miniseries or a Special – Lincoln 1990: Emmy Award for Outstanding Guest Actress in a Drama Series – China Beach: Skylark 1993: Emmy Award for Outstanding Guest Actress in a Comedy Series – Evening Shade: They Can't Take That Away from Me 1995: Emmy Award for Outstanding Performer in an Animated Program – Whitewash 2001: Emmy Award for Outstanding Performer in an Animated Program – Little Bill 2002: Lucille Lortel Award for Outstanding Actress – Saint Lucy's Eyes 2003: Emmy Award for Outstanding Performer in an Animated Program – Little Bill 2008: Academy Award for Best Actress in a Supporting Role – American Gangster 2008: Image Award for Outstanding Supporting Actress in a Motion Picture – American Gangster 2008: Screen Actors Guild Outstanding Cast in a Motion Picture – American Gangster 2009: Screen Actors Guild Outstanding Performance by a Female Actress in a Television Movie or Miniseries – America 2010: Image Award for Outstanding Actress in a Television Movie, Mini-Series or Dramatic Event – America''

Books

See also
 List of oldest and youngest Academy Award winners and nominees

References

External links

 
 
 Life's Essentials with Ruby Dee
 Archive of American Television interview
 Ruby Dee at the Internet Off-Broadway Database
 
 Ruby Dee's oral history video excerpts at The National Visionary Leadership Project
 Ruby Dee Discography at Smithsonian Folkways
 

African-American actresses
American memoirists
1922 births
2014 deaths
American film actresses
American stage actresses
American television actresses
Caedmon Records artists
Drama Desk Award winners
Grammy Award winners
Kennedy Center honorees
Obie Award recipients
Spingarn Medal winners
United States National Medal of Arts recipients
Outstanding Performance by a Female Actor in a Supporting Role Screen Actors Guild Award winners
Outstanding Performance by a Supporting Actress in a Miniseries or Movie Primetime Emmy Award winners
Activists for African-American civil rights
African-American journalists
African-American women journalists
Hunter College alumni
Hunter College High School alumni
Delta Sigma Theta members
Burials at Ferncliff Cemetery
People from Harlem
Actresses from New Rochelle, New York
Activists from New York (state)
Actresses from Cleveland
Journalists from New York (state)
African-American activists
20th-century American actresses
21st-century American actresses
20th-century American women writers
21st-century American women writers
21st-century American non-fiction writers
Women civil rights activists
20th-century African-American women writers
20th-century African-American writers
21st-century African-American women
African-American history of Westchester County, New York